The Canadian Oxford Dictionary is a dictionary of Canadian English.  First published by Oxford University Press Canada in 1998, it became a well-known reference for Canadian English.

The second edition, published in 2004, contains about 300,000 entries, including about 2,200 true Canadianisms. It also provides information on Canadian pronunciation and on Canadian spelling, which has features of both British and American spelling: colour, centre, and travelling, but tire, aluminum and realize.

Editorial staff and development method
Until September 2008, Oxford maintained a permanent staff of lexicographers in Canada, led by editor Katherine Barber. With its Canadian dictionary division closed, Oxford has since been outsourcing work on Canadian dictionary products to freelance editors.

Editions and versions 

 

Prior editions

Picture dictionary

Paperback

 Alex Bisset, editor. The Canadian Oxford Paperback Dictionary (first edition 2000, reissued 2004, second edition 2006) Toronto, Oxford University Press.

Compact
 The Canadian Oxford Compact Dictionary (published 2001, reissued 2004)

Concise
 Concise Canadian Oxford Dictionary (published 2005)

High school
 The Canadian Oxford High School Dictionary (published 2002, reissued 2004)

Spelling
 The Canadian Oxford Spelling Dictionary (published 1999, reissued 2004)

Juvenile
 My First Canadian Oxford Dictionary

Other Canadian English dictionaries
Two other major Canadian English dictionaries are the ITP Nelson Canadian Dictionary and the Gage Canadian Dictionary.

See also
 List of Canadian English dictionaries

References

External links 

 
 

English dictionaries
English language in Canada
Oxford dictionaries
1998 non-fiction books
Canadian English